Lockhaven is an unincorporated community in Jersey County, Illinois, United States. It is located along Illinois Route 100, about seven miles northwest of Alton.

References

Unincorporated communities in Illinois
Unincorporated communities in Jersey County, Illinois